Harold Kay (1926–1990) was a French actor.

Selected filmography
 The Cat Shows Her Claws (1960)

1926 births
1990 deaths
French male television actors
French television presenters
People from Courbevoie
French male film actors
20th-century French male actors